Anna Geislerová, also known as Aňa Geislerová (born 17 April 1976), is a Czech actress. She became well known for her double role of Eliška/Hana in movie Želary (2003) and as Anna in Návrat idiota (1999). A former model, Geislerová made her feature film debut at age 12.

Career 
Born in Prague, Czechoslovakia, Geislerová's rise to national fame began at the early age of 14 when she debuted in Filip Renč's Requiem pro panenku in 1991. Since then, the country has followed her career closely, watching her metamorphose into the Czech Republic's most recognised celebrity on the small and silver screens. Her numerous acting credits include Academy Award winner Jan Svěrák's Jízda in 1994 as well as the film adaptation of Michal Viewegh's internationally acclaimed novel Výchova dívek v Čechách (1997).

Geislerová has been nominated four times for a Czech Lion (Czech Academy Award) winning twice; first for Best Actress in 1999 for her performance in Saša Gedeon's The Idiot Returns, and again in 2003 for Ondřej Trojan's Želary, which was also nominated for the Academy Award for Best Foreign Language Film.

In 2004, she was named one as European films' Shooting Stars by European Film Promotion.

Geislerová is part of the Shooting Stars jury 2010, which selected 10 European up-and-coming actors from the group of nominees for receiving the Shooting Star Award 2010 in February at the Berlin International Film Festival.

Personal life
Geislerová and her husband Zdeněk Janáček have a daughter Stella, and sons Bruno and Max. She has two sisters,  and Ester; and her aunt Zuzana is also an actress.

Filmography

Awards

Notes
A  The award shared with co-star Tatiana Vilhelmová for her role of Olga in the same movie by Saša Gedeon.
B  The award shared with Annette Bening for her role of Julia Lambert in Being Julia (2004) directed by István Szabó.

References

External links 

 
 Anna Geislerová at Shooting Stars
 CSFD.cz – Anna Geislerová (Czech)
 FDb.cz – Anna Geislerová (Czech)

1976 births
Czech child actresses
Czech film actresses
Living people
Actresses from Prague
21st-century Czech actresses
Sun in a Net Awards winners
Czech Lion Awards winners